The Maldives national cricket team represents the country of the Maldives in international cricket. Although they did not become an affiliate member of the International Cricket Council (ICC) until 2001, they have taken part in the ACC Trophy on every occasion since its inception in 1996. They have never progressed beyond the first round of the tournament. They became an associate member in 2017.

With the separation of the ACC Trophy into Elite and Challenge divisions, following their performance at the 2006 ACC Trophy the Maldives have since competed in the Challenge divisions in both 2009 (when they came 3rd) and in the 2010 competition.  The 2010 competition marked their first victory in an international tournament, defeating Saudi Arabia by 1 wicket in the final of the competition.

Starting from 2018, Asif Khan coaches the men's national team. From February 2013, Nilantha Cooray is the national development cricket coach.

History

2018-Present
In April 2018, the ICC decided to grant full Twenty20 International (T20I) status to all its members. Therefore, all Twenty20 matches played between the Maldives and other ICC members after 1 January 2019 will be a full T20I.

Maldives made its Twenty20 International debut on 20 January 2019, losing to Kuwait by eight wickets in the 2019 ACC Western Region T20 at Al Emarat Cricket Stadium, Muscat, Oman.

Tournament history

Asia Cup Qualifier 
2018: Did not participate
2020: Did not qualify

ACC Western Region T20
2019: 5th place
2020: Group stage

ACC Trophy

1996: Group stages
1998: Group stages
2000: Group stages
2002: Group stages
2004: Group stages
2006: Group stages
2009 Challenge: 3rd place
2010 Challenge: Winners

Asian Games

2010: Group stage
2014: Group stage

Records and Statistics 

International Match Summary — Maldives
 
Last updated 9 July 2022

Twenty20 International 

 Highest team total: 153/6 v Thailand, 29 June 2019 at Kinrara Academy Oval, Kuala Lumpur
 Highest individual score: 67, Mohamed Rishwan v Saudi Arabia, 22 January 2019 at Al Amerat Cricket Stadium, Muscat
 Best individual bowling figures: 5/24, Ibrahim Hassan v Bahrain, 21 January 2019 at Al Amerat Cricket Stadium, Muscat

Most T20I runs for Maldives

Most T20I wickets for Maldives

T20I record versus other nations

Records complete to T20I #1622. Last updated 9 July 2022.

See also
 List of Maldives Twenty20 International cricketers
 Maldives women's national cricket team

References

External links

Cricket in the Maldives
National cricket teams
Cricket
Maldives in international cricket